2020–21 Iran Football's 2nd Division  is the 20th under 2nd Division since its establishment (current format) in 2001. The season featured 21 teams from the 2nd Division 2019–20, three new team relegated from the 2019–20 Azadegan League: Elmoadab Tabriz F.C., Sepidrood Rasht S.C., Nirooye Zamini F.C., and four new teams promoted from the 3rd Division 2019–20: Shahin Bandar Ameri, Mohtasham Tabriz, Vista Toorbin, Oghab Tehran F.C.
These changes has been applied before the season:

Teams

Stadia and locations

Number of teams by region

League table

Group A

Group B

2nd Division  Play-off

Leg 1

Leg 2 

source=
Vista Toorbin Tehran won 3-3 on aggregate (on away goals) and promoted to 2021-22 Azadegan League.

2nd Division  Final

Single Match

Notes

References

League 2 (Iran) seasons
3